Jenny Yang may refer to:
 Jenny Yang (comedian), American comic and writer
 Jenny R. Yang, director of Federal Contract Compliance Programs at the U.S. Department of Labor
 Jenny Y. Yang, American chemist